William Sadler (born 1854, date of death unknown) was a United States Navy sailor and a recipient of the United States military's highest decoration, the Medal of Honor.

Biography
Born in 1854 in Boston, Massachusetts, Sadler joined the Navy from that state. On that day, while Saratoga was off Coaster's Harbor Island, Rhode Island, Second Class Boy Frank Gallagher fell overboard. Sadler jumped into the water and kept the sailor afloat until they were picked up by one of the ship's small boats. For this action, he was awarded the Medal of Honor three years later, on October 18, 1884.

Sadler's official Medal of Honor citation reads:
For jumping overboard from the U.S.S. Saratoga, off Coasters Harbor Island, R.I., 25 June 1881, and sustaining until picked up by a boat from the ship, Frank Gallagher, second class boy, who had fallen overboard.

See also

List of Medal of Honor recipients during peacetime

References

External links

1854 births
Year of death missing
People from Boston
United States Navy sailors
United States Navy Medal of Honor recipients
Non-combat recipients of the Medal of Honor